Agnippe lunaki is a moth of the family Gelechiidae. It is found in Greece, North Macedonia and on Crete. It is also present in Turkey and Syria.

The wingspan is 7.8–9 mm. The costal part of the forewings is black and the posterior part is yellow-cream. The costal margin has small yellow-white spots. The hindwings are light grey. Adults are on wing from June to July.

References

Moths described in 1941
Agnippe
Moths of Europe
Moths of Asia